Potassium voltage-gated channel subfamily C member 1 is a protein that in humans is encoded by the KCNC1 gene.

The Shaker gene family of Drosophila encodes components of voltage-gated potassium channels and comprises four subfamilies. Based on sequence similarity, this gene is similar to one of these subfamilies, namely the Shaw subfamily. The protein encoded by this gene belongs to the delayed rectifier class of channel proteins and is an integral membrane protein that mediates the voltage-dependent potassium ion permeability of excitable membranes.

Expression pattern 
Kv3.1 and Kv3.2 channels are prominently expressed in neurons that fire at high frequency. Kv3.1 channels are prominently expressed in brain (cerebellum > globus pallidus, subthalamic nucleus, substantia nigra > reticular thalamic nuclei, cortical and hippocampal interneurons > inferior colliculi, cochlear and vestibular nuclei), and in retinal ganglion cells.

Physiological role 
Kv3.1/Kv3.2 conductance is necessary and kinetically optimized for high-frequency action potential generation. Kv3.1 channels are important for the high-firing frequency of auditory and fast-spiking GABAergic interneurons, retinal ganglion cells; regulation of action potential duration in presynaptic terminals.

Pharmacological properties 
Kv3.1 currents in heterologous systems are highly sensitive to external tetraethylammonium (TEA) or 4-aminopyridine (4-AP) (IC50 values are 0.2 mM and 29 μM respectively). This can be useful in identifying native channels. The overlapping sensitivity of potassium current to both 0.5 mM TEA and 30 μM 4-AP strongly suggest an action on Kv3.1 subunits.

Transcript variants 
There are two transcript variants of Kv3.1 gene: Kv3.1a and Kv3.1b. Kv3.1 isoforms differ only in their C-terminal sequence.

Clinical significance 
A missense mutation c.959G>A (p.Arg320His) in KCNC1 causes progressive myoclonus epilepsy.

See also
 Voltage-gated potassium channel

References

Further reading

External links 
 
 

Potassium channels